The Next Big Thing is a 2001 romantic comedy film starring Marin Hinkle, Chris Eigeman, Jamie Harris, Connie Britton, and Janet Zarish. It was directed by P.J. Posner.

Plot 
Gus Bishop is a talented but failing New York painter who lacks the marketing savvy to make it in today's art world. After getting pick-pocketed in the subway, Gus' destiny is turned over into the hands of Deech—who promptly burglarizes his home and steals his paintings. To capitalize on his stolen goods, Deech generates interest in Gus' work by creating Geoffrey Boiardi, a fictional artist with a fascinating profile. Geoffrey becomes an overnight sensation while Gus is forced into the shadows of the ever-elusive rising star.

Cast 
 Chris Eigeman as Gus Bishop
 Jamie Harris as Deech Scumble
 Connie Britton as Kate Crowley
 Janet Zarish as Florence Rubin
 Mike Starr as Walter Sznitken
 Farley Granger as Arthur Pomposello
 Marin Hinkle as Shari Lampkin
 Peter Giles as Roger
 Dechen Thurman as Damian Spire
 John Seitz as Mr. Chesick
 Ileen Getz as Trish Kane
 Edward James Hyland as Museum Director (as Ed Hyland)
 Gerta Grunen as Bernice Chesick
 Samia Shoaib as Varda Abromowitz
 Doug Stone as Mr. Willard

Reception
The film received mixed reviews. On Rotten Tomatoes it has an approval rating of 41% based on reviews from 17 critics.
Lawrence Van Gelder of The New York Times called it "a deftly satisfying, comically coherent sendup of the world of art".  In contrast, Kevin Thomas of the Los Angeles Times thought it was "a feeble and tedious satire". Ed Park of The Village Voice said that "Posner's dishearteningly unsophisticated treatment itself rings false".

References

External links 
 

2001 films
Films set in New York City
2000s English-language films